Ronu Majumdar is an Indian flautist in the Hindustani classical music tradition.

Awards, nominations, and music collaborations

In 1981, Ronu Majumdar won the first prize at the All India Radio competition, and the President's Gold Medal.

He has associated with Pandit Ravi Shankar on albums like Passages and Chants of India. He has more than 30 audio releases to his credit. He won the prestigious Aditya Vikram Birla Award in 1999 for his dedication to music. Sahara India Pariwar felicitated him with a lifetime achievement award on the occasion of Jyoti Diwas 2001. In 2014 he won the prestigious Sangeet Natak Akademi award.

Today, Ronu Majumdar is among the more popular musicians on this instrument, and is especially popular with the younger generation for his creative improvisations. Pt Majumdar's music is rooted in the Maihar gharana which has musicians of eminence like Pt Ravi Shankar and Ustad Ali Akbar Khan to its credit. Apart from his concerts all over India in different music festivals, he also participated in the Festival of India in Moscow and Asiad '82 in New Delhi. He has toured extensively in Europe, the United States, Canada, Japan, Singapore, Thailand, Australia, New Zealand and the Middle East.

Majumdar is also known for a number of collaborations and jugalbandis with other leading instrumentalists. An innovative composer, he has also composed several pieces in a fusion of Hindustani classical with other forms of music, particularly Western classical music, including the projects Carrying Hope (Music Today), A Traveller's Tale, Song of Nature (Magnasound), Kal Akela Kahan (Plus Music).

He has also provided short training sessions to budding young artists like Raghavendran Rajasekaran from Singapore. Most recently Pt. Ronuji has conducted a concert of 5,378 flautists on one stage called Venu Naad under the banner of ‘Art of Living’. This event was recorded in the Guinness Book of World Records.

He became a music producer for Nadi Ki Beti Sundari (A Forgotten Daughter), a Bollywood movie produced by Nikhil Chandwani under Walnut Discoveries Pvt. Ltd.

References

External links
Official website

1965 births
Indian flautists
Bansuri players
Musicians from Varanasi
Hindustani instrumentalists
Indian male classical musicians
Indian classical composers
Living people
Recipients of the Sangeet Natak Akademi Award